Foster is a station on the Chicago Transit Authority's 'L' system, on the Purple Line in Evanston, Illinois.  It is located at 900 Foster Street (directional coordinates 2000 north, 900 west), just a few blocks west of Northwestern University's Evanston campus.

History

Structure
Like the rest of the 'L' tracks north of the Wilson station, Foster is elevated on a solid fill embankment, unlike the steel structure commonly associated with the 'L'.  It lacks a formal station house; two staircases on the south side of Foster Street lead up to a small area containing a customer assistant's booth, a farecard vending machine, and two turnstiles.  The island platform is composed of concrete and stretches north from the station entrance, covered by a canopy its entire length.  Southbound trains stop on the west side of the platform, while northbound trains stop at the east part.  The platform can only accommodate six-car trains because the north tip of the platform has been removed, although its framing and canopy are still in place.

Former service
Foster was served by trains of the Chicago North Shore and Milwaukee Railroad on the Shore Line Route.  Like Noyes and Central, Foster had an additional side platform to the west of the southbound track for exclusive use of the North Shore Line, to prevent disembarking customers from transferring to 'L' trains for free.  The platform was removed sometime after the North Shore Line ceased operations over this section of the rapid transit system in 1955, but its concrete footings can still be seen opposite the current platform north of Foster Street.

Modernization
Closure of the Foster station (along with South Boulevard) was proposed in three of the CTA's six potential options for the renovation of the Purple Line and northern section of the Red Line.

Notes and references

Notes

References

External links 

 Foster Station Page at Chicago-L.Org
 Train schedule (PDF) at CTA official site
 Foster Station Page CTA official site
 Foster Street entrance from Google Maps Street View

CTA Purple Line stations
Railway stations in Evanston, Illinois
Railway stations in the United States opened in 1908
Former North Shore Line stations
1908 establishments in Illinois